Anaplan is a business planning software company headquartered in San Francisco, California. Anaplan sells subscriptions for cloud-based business-planning software and provides data for decision-making purposes.

Anaplan's products are used by over 1,000 organizations globally.

The company has been listed as a leader in Gartner's Magic Quadrant for Cloud Financial Planning & Analysis Solutions in 2017, 2018, 2019 and 2020.

History 
In 2006, Anaplan was founded by Guy Haddleton, Sue Haddleton, and Michael Gould in Yorkshire, England.

In 2012 Anaplan brought on Frederic Laluyaux as CEO. Laluyaux eventually left the company 4 years later in April 2016.

A year after Laluyaux became CEO, Anaplan acquired its reseller Vue Analytics in U.K. for an undisclosed amount.

Recent history 
In May 2014, Anaplan introduced its marketplace, Anaplan Hub. Using the marketplace, customers can share and find pre-designed planning models. 

After multiple rounds of funding, to assist with going public, the company hired James Budge as its Chief Financial Officer. As of 2016, Anaplan had over 480 customers in 20 countries.

In January 2017 Anaplan appointed Frank A. Calderoni as CEO. Calderoni took the company public on October 12, 2018, with Anaplan being listed on the NYSE under the ticker symbol PLAN.

In August 2019, Anaplan announced plans to acquire Mintigo, an Israeli-founded predictive marketing and sales analytics company. In November, the company was named to Deloitte Technology Fast 500.

In March 2022, the private equity firm Thoma Bravo announced a definitive agreement to purchase Anaplan for $10.7 billion. The deal closed in June 2022. Thoma Bravo renegotiated the deal to $10.4 billion,  stating that Anaplan had breached the merger agreement by overpaying new workers, although commentators linked the renegotiation to the broader market downturn.

Funding 
Anaplan raised its first venture capital funding within a year of its first sales in 2010. In 2012, the company raised $11.4 million in Series B financing from investors that included Granite Ventures and Shasta Ventures.

Then, In 2014, the company’s Series D funding raised $100 million from new and existing investors including DFJ Growth, Workday, and Shasta Ventures. In 2016, Anaplan raised $90 million and became the second UK-founded company to achieve a $1 billion valuation.

Premji Invest led the fundraising, and was joined by Baillie Gifford, Founders Circle Capital, Harmony Partners, and Anaplan's then-current investors. As of January 2016, Anaplan had raised a total of $240 million in five funding rounds.

Technology 
Anaplan's Hyperblock technology is a patented in-memory database and calculation engine for business planning.

In November 2014, Anaplan announced the launch of the Anaplan App Hub for business planning applications.

References

External links
 

Organizational performance management
Business intelligence companies
Business planning
Financial services companies based in California
Companies formerly listed on the New York Stock Exchange
2018 initial public offerings
Software companies based in the San Francisco Bay Area
Software companies established in 2006
2006 establishments in England
2022 mergers and acquisitions
Private equity portfolio companies